This is a list of fraternities and sororities at Arizona State University.

Interfraternity Council
The Interfraternity Council has the following fraternities:

Multicultural Greek Council
The Multicultural Greek Council has the following members on campus:

National Association of Latino Fraternal Organizations
The National Association of Latino Fraternal Organizations has the following members on campus

National Pan-Hellenic Council
The National Pan-Hellenic Council has the following members on campus

Panhellenic Council
The Panhellenic Council has the following sororities on campus

Arizona State University
Arizona education-related lists